The yellow-breasted antpitta (Grallaria flavotincta) is a species of bird in the family Grallariidae.

It is found in Colombia and Ecuador.

Its natural habitat is subtropical or tropical moist montane forest.

References

yellow-breasted antpitta
Birds of the Colombian Andes
Birds of the Ecuadorian Andes
yellow-breasted antpitta
yellow-breasted antpitta
Taxonomy articles created by Polbot